Matthew E. Young (born October 3, 1982) is a former professional outfielder. He played for the Atlanta Braves and the Detroit Tigers of Major League Baseball (MLB).

Prior to playing professionally, Young attended Plano East Senior High School and the University of New Mexico.

Career

University of New Mexico
In 2002, as a freshman at the University of New Mexico, Young hit .385 with 17 stolen bases in 55 games, and was named the school's 2002 Male Athlete of the Year. In 2003, he hit .327 with 10 stolen bases in 56 games. In 2004, he hit .381 with 16 stolen bases in 56 games. Before he could return to UNM for his senior year, Young was signed by the Braves.

Atlanta Braves
In his first professional season, Young played for the Rome Braves and hit .312 with six home runs, 52 RBIs and 10 stolen bases in 114 games. The following season, he hit .274 with two home runs, 58 RBIs, and 22 stolen bases in 131 games between the Myrtle Beach Pelicans and Mississippi Braves.

On June 27, 2008, he went 4-5, and set a new Southern League record of 11 consecutive hits. The previous mark of 10 consecutive hits had stood for 32 years. The Mississippi Braves won the Southern League Championship in 2008, and Young followed that by hitting .370 (40-for-108) with 10 doubles, three triples, one home run, and 24 RBIs in 29 games for the Mesa Solar Sox of the Arizona Fall League.

Young split  between Mississippi and the Gwinnett Braves, hitting a combined .284 with five home runs, 36 RBIs, and 43 stolen bases in 137 games. He also earned his 2nd consecutive Southern League "Best Hustler" award.

On March 27,  after performing well in the Atlanta Braves Spring Training camp, Young was informed that he had made one of the final bench spots on the major league club, placing him on the 25-man roster. In the third game of the season, Young made his Major-league debut, pinch-running for Chipper Jones and scoring a run.

Detroit Tigers
On January 22, Young signed a minor league deal with the Detroit Tigers with an invitation to Spring Training. Young was released by Detroit on August 10, 2012.

St. Louis Cardinals
On August 17, 2012, one week after being released by the Detroit Tigers, the St. Louis Cardinals signed Young to a minor league contract.

He was granted free agency by the St. Louis Cardinals on November 3, 2012.

Los Angeles Angels of Anaheim
On November 20, 2012, he signed as a free agent with the Los Angeles Angels of Anaheim.

References

External links

1982 births
Living people
American expatriate baseball players in Mexico
Atlanta Braves players
Baseball players from Texas
Detroit Tigers players
Gwinnett Braves players
Major League Baseball outfielders
Memphis Redbirds players
Mexican League baseball center fielders
Mississippi Braves players
Myrtle Beach Pelicans players
New Mexico Lobos baseball players
Piratas de Campeche players
Plano East Senior High School alumni
Rome Braves players
Salt Lake Bees players
Toledo Mud Hens players
Mat-Su Miners players